Tommaso Condulmer also spelled Condulmier, Gondulmier or  Gondulmiero (Venice, 20 August 1759 - Venice, 7 January 1823) was an Italian noble and admiral. After the death of Angelo Emo he took command of the Armada Grossa, and held major responsibilities in the aborted defense of Venice against Napoleon, that eventually led to the fall of the Republic of Venice in 1797.

Biography 
Born in Venice from a noble family that held the patrician dignity, he enlisted at an early age in the navy.

In June 1784, when Emo launched his campaign against the Berber pirates, he was governator di nave (captain) on the 56-gun heavy frigate Concordia stationed in Corfù: after the arrival of the venetian Grand Admiral on the island, he was put under his command, and eventually set sails for Tunis with the Venetian squadron.

See also 
 Angelo Emo
 Venetian Navy
 Venetian bombardments of the Beylik of Tunis (1784-88)

1759 births
Republic of Venice admirals
18th-century Italian people
People of the Barbary Wars
1823 deaths
People involved in anti-piracy efforts